Jason W. Cabinda (born March 17, 1996) is an American football fullback for the Detroit Lions of the National Football League (NFL). He played college football at Penn State and signed with the Oakland Raiders as an undrafted free agent in 2018. He attended Hunterdon Central Regional High School.

High school career 
Cabinda led the Red Devils to a Central Group V championship in 2013, scoring two touchdowns in the 21-0 victory over Manalapan High School. Notably, he totaled 3,417 yards as a rusher from his sophomore to senior year and scored 47 total touchdowns.

College career
Cabinda played four seasons for the Nittany Lions, playing in 43 games and starting 36 games. He finished his Penn State career ninth all-time in career tackles with 286 and accumulated six career sacks, 16.5 tackles for loss, three forced fumbles, one fumble recovery, 11 passes defensed and one interception.  Cabinda was named Third-team All-Big Ten by the coaches and honorable mention All-Big Ten by the media in 2016.

Statistics

Professional career

Oakland Raiders
Cabinda signed with the Oakland Raiders as an undrafted free agent on May 4, 2018. He was waived on September 1, 2018 and was signed to the practice squad the next day. He was promoted to the active roster on October 16, 2018.

On August 31, 2019, Cabinda was waived by the Raiders.

Detroit Lions
On September 2, 2019, Cabinda was signed to the Detroit Lions practice squad. He was promoted to the active roster on December 3, 2019.

Cabinda was given an exclusive-rights free agent tender by the Lions on March 4, 2021. He signed the one-year contract on April 6.

On February 17, 2022, Cabinda signed a two-year contract extension with the Lions through the 2023 season. He was placed on the reserve/PUP list to start the season on August 23, 2022. He was activated on November 12.

Personal life
Cabinda's mother hails from Cameroon.

References

External links
Detroit Lions bio
Penn State Nittany Lions bio

1996 births
Living people
American football linebackers
American people of Cameroonian descent
Detroit Lions players
Hunterdon Central Regional High School alumni
Oakland Raiders players
Penn State Nittany Lions football players
People from Buena Park, California
People from Flemington, New Jersey
Players of American football from New Jersey
Sportspeople from Hunterdon County, New Jersey
Sportspeople from Orange County, California